Kvernes is a village in Averøy Municipality in Møre og Romsdal county, Norway. It is located on the east coast of the island of Averøya, along the Kvernesfjorden. County Road 247 runs through the village. There are two churches in Kvernes: Kvernes Stave Church (built in the 14th century) and the Kvernes Church (built in the 19th century). The stave church is now a museum.

The village of Kvernes was the administrative centre of Kvernes Municipality from 1838 until 1964 when the municipality was dissolved.

References

Villages in Møre og Romsdal
Averøy
Millennium sites